Martin Popovski (born 26 August 1994) is a Macedonian handball player for GC Amicitia Zürich and the North Macedonia national team.

Accomplishments
RK Vardar

Domestic competitions
 Macedonian Handball Super League
 Winner (2):  2017–18, 2018–19

 Macedonian Handball Cup
 Winner (1):  2018

 Macedonian Handball Super Cup
 Winner (2):  2018, 2019

European competitions
 EHF Champions League 
 Winner (1):  2018–19

Other competitions
 SEHA League
 Winner (2):  2017–18, 2018–19

 IHF Super Globe
 Third placed:  2019

References

External links

1994 births
Living people
Macedonian male handball players
Sportspeople from Štip
RK Vardar players
Competitors at the 2018 Mediterranean Games
Mediterranean Games competitors for North Macedonia